This list of design awards is an index to articles about notable awards given for design. It excludes architecture, fashion and motor vehicle design, but includes industrial design.

Americas

Asia and Oceania

Europe

United Kingdom

See also

Lists of awards
List of architecture awards
List of fashion awards

References

 
Design
Awards